Brisinga synaptoma is a species of starfish in the family Brisingidae, found in deep sea waters off the coast of New Zealand.

References

Brisingida
Animals described in 1970